Tini Koopmans (26 May 1912 – 17 December 1981) was a Dutch athlete. She competed in the women's high jump and the women's discus throw at the 1936 Summer Olympics.

References

1912 births
1981 deaths
Athletes (track and field) at the 1936 Summer Olympics
Dutch female high jumpers
Dutch female discus throwers
Olympic athletes of the Netherlands
Sportspeople from Groningen (city)
20th-century Dutch women